L'Ardoise is a small community located on Nova Scotia Route 247 in Richmond County on Cape Breton Island, in Nova Scotia, Canada.

The community has a rich history of French and Acadian culture.

References

Communities in Richmond County, Nova Scotia
General Service Areas in Nova Scotia